Petromax is a 2019 Indian Tamil-language comedy horror film directed by Rohin Venkatesan and produced by Passion Studios. The film starring Tamannaah, Prem, Yogi Babu, Ramdoss, Kaali Venkat, Sathyan and TSK. This film is a remake of the Telugu film Anando Brahma and it opened to mixed reviews.

Plot
The story takes place in a supposed haunted house, owned by a rich NRI named Saravanan from Malaysia, who wants to sell it after the "death" of his parents. A bad guy, who runs a liquor shop along with a friend of Saravanan, scares away prospective buyers. Actually, the bungalow is possessed by four friendly spirits, led by Meera, who have an agenda of their own. Saravanan ropes in four men who are hard up for cash: Senthil, Thangam, Nandha, and King Kaali. He challenges the men to live in the "haunted house", and prove that it is "spirit free". The "ghostbusters" take up the challenge owing to their desperate condition. Subsequently, a plot twist happens that unites them against a common enemy.

The story shifts to the past where Saravanan is the former son of Vijay Karupatti and Kamala. Saravanan went to Malaysia for some work. Meera is adopted by Kamala. However, Saravanan wanted to sell the house but the family refused to accept his idea. In retaliation, Saravanan kills them by poisoning them but Meera is alive so he killed her by smashing her face and burns their bodies. It is also revealed that Kamala who witnessed the incident escaped but meets with an accident.

Cast

Production 
The film was shot in 42 working days, and the title was revealed on 18 July 2019. It is a reference to the dialogue "Petromax lightey daan venumaa?" (Do you want only the petromax light?) from the 1984 film Vaidehi Kathirunthal. Leo John Paul and Ghibran, who earlier collaborated with the director's Adhe Kangal film was retained as film editor and music director respectively. Dani Raymond, the co-cinematographer of the film Achcham Yenbadhu Madamaiyada, was selected as the cinematographer, and Vinoth Rajkumar of 96 fame was selected as the art director.

Marketing
The first look poster of the film was unveiled on 19 July 2019. The second look poster was unveiled by Aishwarya Rajesh on 8 August 2019. The trailer is scheduled to release on 30 September 2019, by director Atlee.

Music 

The music is composed by Ghibran, who earlier composed for the film's director earlier film Adhe Kangal. The music rights are secured by Think Music India. A single from the film, "Malarudhu Pudhu Naale", which was written by S. N. Anuradha and sung by Roshini, was released on 27 September 2019.

Release 
Petromax was released on 11 October 2019. Satellite rights of the film was bagged by Star Vijay. It was released on Amazon Prime on 12 November 2019.

Reception
Behindwoods rated 2.5/5, stating that "The entertaining humour in the second half makes 'Petromax' enjoyable". Firstpost, rated 2.5/5. stating that "Petromax is more of a time pass comedy caper than a horror film."

References

External links

2019 films
2010s Tamil-language films
Tamil remakes of Telugu films
Indian comedy horror films
Films scored by Mohamaad Ghibran
Indian ghost films